Zagora is a province in the Moroccan region of Drâa-Tafilalet. Its population in 2004 was 283,368.

The major cities and towns are:
 Agdz
 Zagora

Subdivisions
The province is divided administratively into the following:

References

Zagora pictures

 
Zagora Province